Leer is a town in the district of Leer, in the northwestern part of Lower Saxony, Germany. It is situated on the river Leda, a tributary of the river Ems, near the border with the Netherlands. With 34,958 inhabitants (2021), it is the third-largest city in East Frisia after Emden and Aurich.

It has a railway and autobahn connection to Groningen, Netherlands, Emden, Bremen and the South (Rheine and the Ruhrpott industrial region).

Geography
Leer had been a settlement long before it was first mentioned in written documents. Originally, the city was situated at a meander near the mouth of the river Leda into the Ems, which is still the center of the town today.
Leer lies close to the Dutch border; the district of Leer shares a border with the Dutch province of Groningen. The island and nature reserve of Bingumer Sand lies within the district.

History

There are many traces of early settlements in the area, including crude flint tools that are dated back to roughly 3200 BC.

In 791 AD Saint Ludger built the first chapel in East Frisia at the western edge of the settlement Leer, then still named Hleri after feetlot, willow. This chapel is mentioned for the first time in a written document from 850 AD.

During the 14th and 15th centuries, Leer was hometown of the Ukena family, which was one most influential East-Frisian chieftain families of that time. The town profited from the trade with the Hanse, and a fortress Leerort was built.

In 1508, Count Edzard obtained the official right to host a market, which started the tradition of the "Gallimarkt," which is now an annual fair. In 1744 East Frisia fell to Prussia, then ruled by Frederick the Great. Town privileges were awarded in 1823 by George IV, King of Hanover.

In 1854 Leer became connected to the "Hannoversche Westbahn" railway, which at that time connected Emden and Rheine in the Ruhr area. In 1856, the Westbahn was connected to the central German railway network.

Unlike Emden, Leer only suffered little damage by Allied bombing in World War II. The city was occupied by Canadian troops on 28 April 1945.

On 1 October 1955, Leer received the status of an independent city.

Politics
Since 1964 the city's government has been led by the Social-Democratic Party SPD. The major opposition parties are the Christian Democratic Union Party CDU, the Green Party and the Allgemeine Wählergemeinschaft (AWG), an independent local party. The mayor of Leer is Claus-Peter Horst, elected in 2021.

The town council consists of (elections of 2016):

 SPD: 36.7% / 14 seats
 CDU: 27.9% / 11 seats
 AWG: 10.2% / 4 seats
 Grüne: 13.9% / 5 seats
 FDP: 3.0% / 1 seat
 The Left: 3.1% / 1 seat
CDL: 3.5% / 1 seat
BfL 1.3%: / 1 seat
Haase 0.5%: / 0 seat

Mayors

Notable buildings
 Harderwykenburg
 Haneburg
 Evenburg
 Philippsburg (Castle)
 Telecommunication tower "Leer-Nüttermoor" (Height:160 meters)

Religion
Leer is a traditional Protestant city and home to both the Lutheran and Reformed churches. The German Reformed Church has its head office in Leer. Furthermore, Leer offers an unusually large variety of smaller religious communities, especially Baptists, Mennonites, Methodists, Adventists and Mormons. Even though Eastern Frisia is a mainly a Protestant region, there is a small Roman Catholic community in Leer.

Economics and infrastructure
Two autobahns (freeways) cross north of Leer, the A 28 (Leer – Bremen) and the A 31 (Emden – Oberhausen, Ruhr Area). The city itself has three junctions to the autobahns. Leer railway station is a relay station between Groningen and Bremen in the west–east direction and the South and Emden harbour (with a large VW factory and shipping facilities) in the north. The airfield Leer-Papenburg north of the city offers limited passenger flights to nearby airfields, most notably the East Frisian Islands. The closest international airport is Bremen International Airport.

Leer is home to many German shipping companies – about 20 per cent of the German merchant fleet are registered in Leer. The Bünting group Home is based in Leer and is one of the city's main employers. Although Bünting owns several German supermarket chains, the company is best known for their tea, which is available all over Germany.

Each year in autumn the Gallimarkt is held. Traditionally a cattle-market, the Gallimarkt is now one of the largest fairs in Northwest Germany.

Education
In Leer there are seven primary schools and numerous secondary schools. The two gymnasiums, Telletta-Gross-Gymnasium and Ubbo-Emmius-Gymnasium, educate more than 1,500 pupils each and are two of the largest grammar schools in Lower Saxony. The Navigation School is now a faculty of the Hochschule Emden – Leer (University of applied science). The town also offers education at two vocational schools.

Twin towns – sister cities

Leer is twinned with:
 Elbląg, Poland
 Trowbridge, United Kingdom

Notable people

Focko Ukena (1370–1436), East Frisian chieftain
Ubbo Emmius (1547–1625), theologian, historian from the University of Groningen
Gustaaf Willem Baron van Imhoff (1705–1750), governor-general of Dutch East India
 (1818–1901), co-founder of the German Baptists
Onno Klopp (1822–1903), publicist and historian
 (1890–1984), author
 (1879–1947), Natural philosopher and scientist
Ernst Reuter (1889–1953), politician and municipal scientist, mayor of West-Berlin 1948–1953
Hermann Lange (1912–1943), blessed priest and Nazi victim
Marron Curtis Fort (1938–2019), professor, linguist and curator of Low German and Frisian languages
Karl Dall (1941–2020), presenter, singer and comedian
Friedel Grützmacher (born 1942), politician of Alliance 90/The Greens
H.P. Baxxter (born 1966), singer of the band Scooter
Garrelt Duin (born 1968), politician (SPD)
Okka Rau (born 1977), beach volleyball player
Christina Hennings (born 1984), rower

References

External links

 
  
 Photo collections about Leer 

Towns in Lower Saxony
Towns and villages in East Frisia
Leer (district)